This is a list of characters from the Star Trek franchise and the media in which they appear. It lists both major and minor fictional characters including those not originally created for Star Trek but featured in it, alongside real-life persons appearing in a fictional manner, such as holodeck recreations.

Characters from all series, listed alphabetically

Key

N

O

P

Q

R

S

See also 
 List of Star Trek characters A–F · G–M · T–Z
 List of recurring Star Trek: Deep Space Nine characters · Discovery · Enterprise · The Next Generation · The Original Series · Voyager
 List of Star Trek episodes

References 

N-S